Ivan Bradach, O.S.B.M. (14 February 1732 – 4 July 1772) was a Ruthenian Greek Catholic hierarch. He was the titular bishop of Rhosus and last Vicar Apostolic for the Ruthenians from 1768 to 1771 and the first eparchial bishop of the new created Ruthenian Catholic Eparchy of Mukacheve from 1771 to 1772.

Born in Torysky, Habsburg monarchy (present day – Slovakia) in 1732, he was ordained a priest on 30 September 1755 for the Basilian Order. Ivan Bradach was an older brother of a future Bishop Mykhaylo Bradach and nephew of Bishops Stefan Olshavskyi and Manuil Olshavskyi. At the death of his predecessor, he was appointed, on 27 January 1768 as general vicar by the Latin bishop of Eger and the Vicar Apostolic for the Ruthenians with titular see of Rhosus. He was consecrated to the Episcopate on 20 April 1768. The principal consecrator was Bishop Meletie Covaci. On 23 September 1771 Bishop Bradach was confirmed as the first bishop of the Eparchy of Mukacheve.

He died in Mukacheve on 4 July 1772.

References 

1732 births
1772 deaths
People from Levoča District
18th-century Eastern Catholic bishops
Bishops of the Uniate Church of the Polish–Lithuanian Commonwealth
Order of Saint Basil the Great